Panji District is a district of the city of Huainan, Anhui Province, China, located to the north of the Huai River and northwest of the city center.

Administrative divisions
In the present, Panji District has 1 subdistrict, 6 towns, 3 townships and 1 ethnic township.
1 Subdistricts
 Tianji

6 Towns

3 Townships
 Hetuan
 Jiagou
 Qiji

1 Ethnic township
 Hui Gugou

References

Huainan
Panji District